Vir  is a village in Bosnia and Herzegovina. According to the 1991 census, the village is located in the municipality of Posušje. Until 1945, it was part of the Kotar of Tomislavgrad.

History 
It has a rich history, starting from the time of the younger (Neolithic) Stone Age and that from its older it means the existing remains of man in the Žukoška cave in the neighboring village of Zagorje, from Roman times to the present day. Illyrian mounds, remains of Roman fortifications, Roman money, stećak tombstones, etc. were found in the area of Vir. In the whole of Herzegovina, Vir was the last to fall under Turkish rule until 1513. During World war I and II many people from Vir died, and many took part in the last Homeland War.

Population

According to the 2013 census, its population was 1,626.

References

Populated places in Posušje